The Lofa or Loffa is a river whose headwaters originate in eastern Guinea northeast of Macenta. The river runs southwest through northeastern Liberia before draining into the North Atlantic Ocean. Historically it has also been known as the Little Cape Mount River. The Lawa River enters the Lofa River in Liberia's Lofa County.

Indigenous species include the pygmy hippopotamus. Several diamond mining concessions along the Lofa River were granted in the late 1950s and early 1960s.

Notes

Rivers of Guinea
Rivers of Liberia
International rivers of Africa